Amanda is a 2022 Italian comedy-drama film directed by Carolina Cavalli.

The film premiered at the Horizons Extra section of the 79th Venice Film Festival, and later was screened at the Toronto International Film Festival. It was released in Italy on 13 October 2022.

Cast
Benedetta Porcaroli as Amanda
Galatéa Bellugi as Rebecca
Michele Bravi as Dude
Giovanna Mezzogiorno as Viola
Monica Nappo as Sofia
Margherita Maccapani Missoni as Marina

References

External links

2022 films
2020s Italian-language films
2022 comedy-drama films
Italian comedy-drama films
2020s Italian films